The Santa Maria is a residential skyscraper in the City of Miami, Florida, United States. The building is located in the city's Brickell neighborhood, south of Downtown. The address is 1643 Brickell Avenue. The building is just a short distance from the Brickell Financial District. The building was completed in 1997, before the most recent major building boom in Miami began.

See also
List of tallest buildings in Miami

External links 
Santa Maria on Emporis
List of tallest completed buildings in Miami

Residential skyscrapers in Miami
1997 establishments in Florida
Residential buildings completed in 1997